Wale  or WALE may refer to:

Places
Wale, Devon, a hamlet in England
Wale, Tomaszów Mazowiecki County, a village in Poland

People
Wale (surname)
Wale (rapper), stage name of American rapper Olubowale Victor Akintimehin

Radio and television stations
WALE-LD, a low-power television station (channel 16, virtual 17) licensed to serve Montgomery, Alabama, United States
WBHU 105.5 FM, a radio station licensed to St. Augustine Beach, Florida, United States, which held the call sign WALE in 2014
WALE (Rhode Island) 990 AM, a defunct radio station licensed to Providence and later Greenville, Rhode Island, United States that held the WALE callsign from 1989 until its deletion on April 1, 2014
WHTB 1440 AM, a radio station licensed to Fall River, Massachusetts that held the callsign WALE until 1989

Other uses
Wale (ship part), a plank around the outside of a ship
Wale (2018 film), a short film with Jamie Sives
Wale, welt or wheal, a type of skin lesion 
Wale, a term used to express cord width for corduroy materials
HSwMS Wale, a Royal Swedish Navy destroyer

See also
Wales (disambiguation)
Whale (disambiguation)
Wail (disambiguation)
Wael, Arabic surname